First Congregational Church of Michigan City is a historic Congregational church building at 531 Washington Street in Michigan City, LaPorte County, Indiana.  The church building was built in 1880-1881 and constructed in a Romanesque, Tudor Revival style.  It was rebuilt in 1908-1909 following a fire.  It is the second oldest church building in Michigan City.

It was listed on the National Register of Historic Places in 2001. It is located in the Haskell and Barker Historic District.

References

Churches on the National Register of Historic Places in Indiana
Romanesque Revival church buildings in Indiana
Tudor Revival architecture in Indiana
Churches completed in 1881
Buildings and structures in LaPorte County, Indiana
Tourist attractions in LaPorte County, Indiana
National Register of Historic Places in LaPorte County, Indiana
Historic district contributing properties in Indiana
1881 establishments in Indiana